Žan Medved (born 14 June 1999) is a Slovenian professional footballer who plays as a forward for Skalica, on loan from Slovan Bratislava.

Club career

Slovan Bratislava
Medved made his professional Slovak Super Liga debut for Slovan Bratislava during a home fixture, at Tehelné pole, against AS Trenčín on 22 February 2020. He came on as an 80th-minute replacement for Rafael Ratão, with the final score already set at 2–0 for Slovan.

Honours
Slovan Bratislava
Slovak Super Liga: 2019–20
Slovak Cup: 2019–20

References

External links
 
 NZS profile 
 

1999 births
Living people
Sportspeople from Slovenj Gradec
Slovenian footballers
Slovenian expatriate footballers
Slovenia youth international footballers
Slovenia under-21 international footballers
Association football forwards
NK Aluminij players
NK Olimpija Ljubljana (2005) players
NK Fužinar players
Vis Pesaro dal 1898 players
ŠK Slovan Bratislava players
Wisła Kraków players
NK Celje players
MFK Skalica players
Slovenian Second League players
Serie C players
Slovak Super Liga players
2. Liga (Slovakia) players
Ekstraklasa players
Slovenian PrvaLiga players
Expatriate footballers in Italy
Slovenian expatriate sportspeople in Italy
Expatriate footballers in Slovakia
Slovenian expatriate sportspeople in Slovakia
Expatriate footballers in Poland
Slovenian expatriate sportspeople in Poland